The 1994 Bolivia earthquake occurred on June 9, 1994. The epicenter was located in a sparsely populated region in the Amazon jungle, about 200 miles from La Paz.

The Harvard CMT Project assigned it a focal depth of 647 km and a magnitude  of 8.2, making it, at the time, the largest earthquake since the 1977 Sumba earthquake, later superseded by more recent larger events (e.g., 2004 Indian Ocean earthquake). It is also the second largest earthquake ever recorded with a focal depth greater than 300 km, along with the 2018 Fiji earthquake, the largest currently being the 2013 Okhotsk Sea earthquake. South America also experienced the then second and third largest earthquakes at focal depths greater than 300 km: Colombia, 1970; and northern Peru, 1922.

Description
The rupture was located within the Nazca plate where it is being subducted beneath the mantle of the South American continent. It shook the ground from Argentina to Canada and its oscillations were the first to be captured on a modern seismic network. Such deep events are known as intraplate earthquakes because they occur within a tectonic lithosphere rather than at the boundary of two. The earthquake involved a particularly small slip area of only 30 km by 50 km. In 22 seconds, the rupture propagated with a velocity of 1.5 km/s, which is slower than the average rupture velocity of earthquakes.

Implications
Pressures and temperatures at the depth of 200 to 400 miles are so great that rock should not undergo frictional sliding processes that produce earthquakes on faults at lesser depths, and the physics of deep-focus earthquakes remains a field of research investigation.  The 1994 Bolivia earthquake was notable in that it excited a wide variety of Earth normal modes due to its large magnitude and depth, which were among the first to be recorded by digital very broadband global seismographs.

Effects
There are unconfirmed reports that five people were killed in Peru's Arequipa and Cuzco provinces. Three deaths from Arequipa Province were attributed to a landslide while the other two in Cuzco Province died from falling debris or a heart attack. Many more were injured in landslides in other parts of southern Peru. In Cochabamba, La Paz and Oruro, the windows of many tall structures shattered. Light damage to buildings was reported in Arica, Chile, and Manaus, Brazil, although all these claims have not been verified. Limited damage to buildings was reported in São Paulo, Brazil, and Toronto, Canada, as well. In Chile, the tremors caused panic among residents of major cities, driving them out of buildings. The earthquake also disrupted power and communication services.

Due to the earthquake's great depth, it was felt at places extremely far from its epicenter. A geologist with the US Geological Survey described the effects in Los Angeles, California, as a "very gentle motion". Similar effects were observed in Sioux Falls, Sioux City, Minneapolis, and Omaha in the United States.

See also

 List of earthquakes in 1994
 1582 Ancuancu earthquake
 Deep-focus earthquakes

References

External links

Bolivia
Earthquakes in Bolivia
20th century in Bolivia
1994 in Bolivia
June 1994 events in South America
1994 disasters in Bolivia